Ed Berry (born September 28, 1963) is a former defensive back in the National Football League and all-star in the Canadian Football League.

After playing at Utah State University, Berry was picked in the seventh round of the 1986 NFL Draft by the Green Bay Packers and played 16 games in 1986. The following season, he played 2 games with the San Diego Chargers.

Berry played 9 seasons in the CFL, with the Toronto Argonauts, Edmonton Eskimos, Memphis Mad Dogs and finally the Toronto Argonauts again. He was an Eastern All-Star in 1989. Berry won two Grey Cups as a Toronto Argonauts in 1991 and 1996.

References

Players of Canadian football from San Francisco
Players of American football from San Francisco
Toronto Argonauts players
Edmonton Elks players
Memphis Mad Dogs players
Green Bay Packers players
San Diego Chargers players
American football defensive backs
Utah State Aggies football players
Living people
1963 births